Juan Abad de Jesús (born 13 February 1965) is a Mexican politician affiliated with the Citizens' Movement (formerly to the National Action Party). Since 2014, he has been a deputy of the LX Legislature of the Mexican Congress representing the State of Mexico. Previously, he was Mayor of Coyotepec from 1997 to 2000 and from 2003 to 2006.

References

1965 births
Living people
Politicians from the State of Mexico
Members of the Chamber of Deputies (Mexico) for the State of Mexico
National Action Party (Mexico) politicians
Citizens' Movement (Mexico) politicians
Municipal presidents in the State of Mexico
21st-century Mexican politicians
Instituto Tecnológico Autónomo de México alumni
National Autonomous University of Mexico alumni
20th-century Mexican politicians
Deputies of the LX Legislature of Mexico